Southwest Mountains Rural Historic District is a national historic district located near Keswick, Albemarle County, Virginia.  The district encompasses 854 contributing buildings, 73 contributing sites, 30 contributing structures, and 1 contributing object.  It includes a variety of large farms, historic villages, and crossroads communities. The area is known primarily for its large and imposing Federal, Greek Revival, and Georgian Revival plantation houses and country estates.  It features a broad range of architecture—mainly domestic and farm-related—from the late 18th, 19th, and 20th centuries.

It was added to the National Register of Historic Places in 1992.

References

Historic districts in Albemarle County, Virginia
Federal architecture in Virginia
Greek Revival architecture in Virginia
Italianate architecture in Virginia
National Register of Historic Places in Albemarle County, Virginia
Historic districts on the National Register of Historic Places in Virginia